Cerion is a genus of small to medium-sized tropical air-breathing land snails, terrestrial pulmonate gastropods in the family Cerionidae, sometimes known as the peanut snails. The genus is endemic to the Caribbean region.

The name Cerion is based on the Greek word kerion, signifying honeycomb, and is given to these shells because the form of the shell resembles that of a beehive; hence they were at one time known as beehive shells.

The fossil range of Cerion is possibly from the Upper Cretaceous of Montana, or the early Miocene of Florida. Records of Cerion in Pleistocene are rare.

Species 

Species within the genus Cerion include:

 Cerion acuticostatum Sánchez Roig, 1948
 Cerion aguayoi Torre & Clench, 1932
 Cerion alberti Clench & Aguayo, 1949
 Cerion alleni Torre, 1929
 Cerion anodonta
 Cerion arangoi (Pilsbry & Vanatta, 1896)
 Cerion banesense Clench & Aguayo, 1949
 Cerion barroi Aguayo & Jaume, 1957
 Cerion basistriatum Pilsbry & Vanatta, 1895
 Cerion bioscai Aguayo & Jaume, 1951
 Cerion blanesi Clench & Aguayo, 1951
 Cerion cabocruzense Pilsbry & Torre, 1943
 Cerion capraia
 Cerion caroli Aguayo & Torre, 1951
 Cerion casablancae Bartsch, 1920
 Cerion catherwoodianum Wurtz, 1950
 Cerion ceiba Clench, 1948
 Cerion chaparra Aguayo & Sánchez Roig, 1953
 Cerion chaplini Wurtz, 1950
 Cerion chrysalis(Ferussac in Beck, 1837)
 Cerion chrysaloides
 Cerion circumscriptum Aguayo & Jaume, 1951
 Cerion cisneroi Clench & Aguayo, 1951
 Cerion cobarrubia Aguayo & Jaume, 1951
 Cerion columbiana
 Cerion columbinus Sánchez Roig, 1951
 Cerion coutini Sánchez Roig, 1951
 Cerion crassilabris
 Cerion crassiusculum Torre in Pilsbry & Vanatta, 1899
 Cerion cyclostomum (Küster, 1841)
 Cerion dimidiatum (Pfeiffer, 1847)
 Cerion disforme Clench & Aguayo, 1946
 Cerion dorotheae Aguayo & Jaume, 1951
 Cerion ebriolum Aguayo & Jaume, 1951
 Cerion evolva
 Cerion fasciata
 Cerion feltoni Sánchez Roig, 1951
 Cerion floridanum
 Cerion geophilum Clench & Aguayo, 1949
 Cerion glans (Küster, 1844)
 Cerion grilloensis Sánchez Roig, 1951
 Cerion grisea
 Cerion gundlachi (Pfeiffer, 1852)
 Cerion herrerai Aguayo & Jaume, 1951
 Cerion hessei Clench & Aguayo, 1949
 Cerion humberti Clench & Aguayo, 1949
 Cerion hyperlissum Pilsbry & Vanatta, 1896
 Cerion incanum (A. Binney, 1851)
 Cerion incrassatum (Sowerby, 1876)
 Cerion infandulum Aguayo & Torre, 1951
 Cerion infandum (Shuttleworth in Poey, 1858)
 Cerion iostomum (Pfeiffer, 1854)
 Cerion johnsoni Pilsbry & Vanatta, 1895
 Cerion josephi Clench & Aguayo, 1949
 Cerion kusteri (Pfeiffer, 1854)
 Cerion laureani Clench & Aguayo, 1951
 Cerion longidens Pilsbry, 1902
 Cerion macrodon Aguayo & Jaume, 1951
 Cerion magister Pilsbry & Vanatta, 1896
 Cerion manatiense Aguayo & Jaume, 1951
 Cerion marielinum Torre in Pilsbry, 1927
 Cerion maritimum (Pfeiffer, 1839)
 Cerion microdon Pilsbry & Vanatta, 1896
 Cerion microstonum (Pfeiffer, 1854)
 Cerion miramarae Sánchez Roig, 1951
 Cerion multicostum (Küster, 1845)
 Cerion mumia (Bruguière, 1792)
 Cerion mumiola (Pfeiffer, 1839)
 Cerion nanus (Maynard, 1889)
 Cerion nipense Aguayo, 1953
 Cerion obesum
 Cerion orientale Clench & Aguayo, 1951
 Cerion palmeri Sánchez Roig, 1948
 Cerion pandionis Aguayo & Jaume, 1951
 Cerion paredonis Pilsbry, 1902
 Cerion pastelilloensis Sánchez Roig, 1951
 Cerion paucicostatum Torre, 1929
 Cerion paucisculptum Clench & Aguayo, 1952
 Cerion peracutum Clench & Aguayo, 1951
 Cerion persuasa
 Cerion pilsbryi
 Cerion pinerium Dall, 1895
 Cerion politum (Maynard, 1896)
 Cerion prestoni Sánchez Roig, 1951
 Cerion pretiosus Sánchez Roig, 1951
 Cerion pseudocyclostomum Aguayo & Sánchez Roig, 1953
 Cerion pupilla
 Cerion ramsdeni Torre in Welch, 1934
 Cerion regina
 Cerion regula
 Cerion restricta
 Cerion ricardi Clench & Aguayo, 1951
 Cerion rodrigoi Gould, 1997
 Cerion saccharimeta
 Cerion saetiae Sánchez Roig, 1948
 Cerion sagraianum (Pfeiffer, 1847)
 Cerion sainthilarius Sánchez Roig, 1951
 Cerion sallei
 Cerion salvatori Torre in Pilsbry, 1927
 Cerion sanctacruzense Aguayo & Jaume, 1951
 Cerion sanctamariae Aguayo & Jaume, 1951
 Cerion sanzi Blanes in Pilsbry & Vanatta, 1898
 Cerion scalarinum (Gundlach in Pfeiffer, 1860)
 Cerion scopulorum Aguayo & Jaume, 1951
 Cerion sculptum (Poey, 1858)
 Cerion sisal Clench & Aguayo, 1952
 Cerion striatellum
 Cerion stupida
 Cerion tanamensis Sánchez Roig, 1951
 Cerion tenuilabre (Gundlach in Pfeiffer, 1870)
 Cerion torrei Blanes in Pilsbry & Vanatta, 1898
 Cerion tridentatun Pilsbry & Vanatta, 1895
 Cerion uva (Linnaeus, 1758)
 Cerion vaccinum
 Cerion vanattai Clench & Aguayo, 1951
 Cerion venustum (Poey, 1858)
 Cerion viaregis Bartsch, 1920
 Cerion victor Torre, 1929
 Cerion vulneratum (Küster, 1855)
 Cerion watlingense Dall, 1907
 Cerion yumaensis

References

External links 
 Delimitation and phylogenetics of the diverse land-snail family Urocoptidae (gastropoda: Pulmonata) based on 28S rRNA sequence data: a reunion with cerion.
 http://invertebrates.si.edu/Cerion/species_list.cfm
 Yesha Shrestha, Herman H. Wirshing, M. G. Harasewych : The Genus Cerion (Gastropoda: Cerionidae) in the Florida Keys; PLOS|ONE September 17, 2015

Cerionidae
Taxa named by Peter Friedrich Röding
Taxonomy articles created by Polbot